Bryce Christopher Johnson (born October 27, 1995) is an American professional baseball outfielder in the San Francisco Giants organization. He played college baseball at Sam Houston State University.  The Giants selected Johnson in the sixth round of the 2017 MLB draft. In 2021, he led the Triple-A West in stolen bases. He made his MLB debut in August 2022.

Early life
Johnson was born in Cypress, Texas. He attended Cypress Ranch High School. He played for the school's baseball team; MaxPreps named him to the 2013 Texas Class 5A All-District Baseball First Team.  He also played for the school's football team, playing as a wide receiver in football; MaxPreps named him to the 2013 Texas 5A All-District Football First Team.

College
Johnson attended Sam Houston State University in Huntsville, Texas, to play college baseball for the Sam Houston State Bearkats. In his freshman season in 2015 he batted .310/.392/.364 with 16 stolen bases (6th in the Southland Conference) in 21 attempts. He was named Southland Conference Honorable Mention. 

He began switch-hitting in his sophomore year in college to take advantage of his speed. In Johnson's sophomore season in 2016 he batted .345(8th in the Conference)/.401/.418 in 261 at bats, with 51 runs (5th), 8 sacrifice hits (9th), and 20 stolen bases (2nd) in 27 attempts, and his 90 hits ranked 20th in the nation as well as first in the Conference. He was  named Second-Team All-Southland Conference. In 2016, he played collegiate summer baseball with the Falmouth Commodores of the Cape Cod Baseball League.

In his junior season in 2017 with Sam Houston State he batted .350(5th in the Conference)/.453(5th)/.434 in 263 at bats, with 63 runs (2nd), 5 triples (leading the conference), 34 walks (10th), 17 hit by pitch (3rd), and 33 stolen bases (2nd) in 40 attempts. The San Francisco Giants selected Johnson in the sixth round of the 2017 MLB draft, and he signed for a signing bonus of $210,000.

Professional career
In 2017 with the Class A- Salem-Keizer Volcanoes he batted .329(3rd in the Northwest League)/.400(6th)/.369 in 222 at bats, and 10 hit by pitch (2nd), with 25 stolen bases (4th) in 35 attempts. He played 43 games in left field, 15 in center field, and one in right field, and had 8 assists and a 1.000 fielding percentage. He was named an NWL post-season All Star.

In 2018 with the Class A+ San Jose Giants, he batted .249/.339/.324	in 441 at bats, with 54 walks (6th  in the California League), 7 sacrifice hits (4th), and 31 stolen bases (3rd) in 35 attempts. He played all 112 games in center field, had 7 assists, and had a 1.000 fielding percentage. He received the MiLB Gold Glove Award.

In 2019 with the Richmond Flying Squirrels and the San Jose Giants, in aggregate he batted .255/.346/.366 in 470 at bats with 26 steals. He played 73 games in right field, 43 games in center field, and six games in left field.

In 2021 with the Class AAA Sacramento River Cats in the Triple-A West he batted .286/.377/.433 in 363 at bats. He scored 65 runs, with 5 triples (9th in the league), 9 home runs, 44 RBIs, 48 walks (9th in the league), 108 strikeouts (4th in the league), and 30 stolen bases (leading the league) in 34 attempts. He played 56 games in center field, 14 games in right field, and 12 games in left field.

In 2022, with AAA Sacramento he batted .290/.369/.401 in 307 at bats, with 41 runs, four triple, five home runs, and 36 RBIs, as he stole 31 bases (6th in the PCL) in 36 attempts. He played 67 games in center field, 15 in left field, nine in right field, and two at DH. The Giants promoted Johnson to the major leagues on August 3, and with them he batted 2-for-19. At the time of his call-up, he was batting .283 in 237 at bats with five home runs, three triples, seven hit by pitch (7th in the Pacific Coast League), and 31 stolen bases (6th) in 36 attempts in Triple A in 2022. He was sent outright off the roster on November 9, 2022.

References

External links

Living people
1995 births
People from Cypress, Texas
Baseball players from Texas
Major League Baseball outfielders
San Francisco Giants players
Sam Houston Bearkats baseball players
Falmouth Commodores players
Salem-Keizer Volcanoes players
San Jose Giants players
Richmond Flying Squirrels players
Sacramento River Cats players